is a Japanese national highway connecting Oshamambe and Muroran in southwestern Hokkaido. The  highway begins at an intersection with national routes 5 and 230 in the town of Oshamambe. It travels along the northern side of Uchiura Bay, paralleling the Dō-Ō Expressway. At the eastern edge of the bay it enters the city of Muroran where it ends at an intersection with National Route 36.

Route description

National Route 37 is an  highway in southwestern Hokkaido that runs east from Oshamambe to Muroran. Its eastern terminus lies at an intersection in central Oshamambe where it meets national routes 5 and 230. From there national routes 37 and 230 travel together paralleling the coastline of Uchiura Bay and the Dō-Ō Expressway. Along the way from Oshamambe to Muroran, it passes through the towns of Toyoura and Tōyako and the city of Date. National Route 230 leaves National Route 37 in Toyoura traveling north to Lake Tōya and Sapporo. Shortly after crossing in to Muroran, the route splits from the Hakuchō Shindō, a bypass of National Route 37 that crosses the Hakuchō Bridge to the tip of Cape Chikiu and central Muroran, while the main route continues to eastern Muroran. National Route 37's eastern terminus in eastern Muroran is at an intersection where it meets National Route 36.

History
On 4 December 1952 the route was designated as Primary National Highway 37 between Oshamambe and Muroran. On 1 April 1965 the highway's designation was revised along with the other primary routes as General National Highway 37. When Mount Usu erupted on 31 March 2000, the town of Abuta was left with only National Route 37 as an evacuation route when the Dō-Ō Expressway closed.

Major junctions
The route lies entirely within Hokkaido.

Auxiliary routes

Hakuchō Shindō
The Hakuchō Shindō is a  auxiliary route of National Route 37 in the city of Muroran that crosses the Hakuchō Bridge to the tip of Cape Chikiu. It serves as central Muroran's primary arterial highway, whereas the main route serves eastern Muroran.

References

External links

037
Roads in Hokkaido